Alban Malcolm Davies (15 January 1926 – 27 February 2011) was a Welsh rugby union, and a professional rugby league footballer who played in the 1940s and 1950s.

Playing career

International honours
Malcolm Davies won 2 caps for Wales (RL) in 1953–1959 while at Leigh, and Bradford Northern.

Club career
At Cardiff, Malcolm Davies played alongside; Rex Willis, Cliff Morgan, and Dr Jack Matthews, and was later a member of Cardiff's former players' association. In the 1952–53 Northern Rugby Football League season he changed codes, and joined the rugby league side Leigh, he was on the verge of returning to Wales, when in 1956 he was sold to Bradford Northern for £750, a year later in 1957 he was sold to Leeds for £3,000 (based on increases in average earnings, this would be approximately £151,900 in 2013), he was later sold back to Bradford Northern for £1,000.

Outside of rugby
Following his retirement from rugby, Malcolm Davies established a glass and china wholesalers on High Street, Barry. Following his retirement, he became involved with Sully Community Council and spent five years as its chairman.

Genealogical information
Malcolm Davies' marriage to Barbara M. (née Harris) was registered during fourth ¼ 1949 in East Glamorgan district, they had two children; Allan M. (birth registered during fourth ¼ 1950 in East Glamorgan district), and Yvonne M. (birth registered during second ¼ 1955 in East Glamorgan district), two grandchildren, and two great-grandchildren. Malcolm Davies' funeral service was held at St. John's Baptist Church, Sully, on Monday 14 March 2011, followed by cremation at Coychurch Crematorium.

References

External links
Photograph 'Malcolm Davies' at rlhp.co.uk
'Youth services are a priority'
Alban Malcolm Davies : Obituary
Cardiff RFC Season Review 1949 - 1950

1926 births
2011 deaths
Bradford Bulls players
Cardiff RFC players
Footballers who switched code
Leeds Rhinos players
Leigh Leopards players
Maesteg RFC players
Penarth RFC players
Rugby league players from Bridgend County Borough
Rugby league wingers
Rugby union players from Bridgend County Borough
Rugby union wings
Wales national rugby league team players
Welsh rugby league players
Welsh rugby union players